Esther Dyson (born 14 July 1951) is a Swiss-born American investor, journalist, author, commentator and philanthropist. She is the executive founder of Wellville, a nonprofit project focused on improving equitable wellbeing. Dyson is also an angel investor focused on health care, open government, digital technology, biotechnology, and outer space. Dyson's career now focuses on health and she continues to invest in health and technology startups.

Education and early life
Esther Dyson's father was English-born, American-naturalized physicist Freeman Dyson, and her mother was mathematician Verena Huber-Dyson, of Swiss parentage; her brother is science historian George Dyson. She was educated at Harvard University where she studied economics and wrote for The Harvard Crimson.

Career
After graduating she joined Forbes as a fact-checker and quickly rose to reporter. In 1977, she joined New Court Securities following Federal Express and other start-ups. After a stint at Oppenheimer Holdings covering software companies, she moved to Rosen Research in 1982. In 1983, when she bought the company from her employer Ben Rosen, Dyson renamed the company EDventure Holdings and his Rosen Electronic Letter newsletter Release 1.0. She and business partner Daphne Kis sold EDventure Holdings to CNET Networks in 2004 and left CNET in January 2007.

On 7 October 2008, Space Adventures announced that Dyson had paid to train as a back-up spaceflight participant for Charles Simonyi's trip to the International Space Station aboard the Soyuz TMA-14 mission which took place in 2009.

In 1997, Dyson wrote that as of that time she had never voted. The tagline of her email signature block reads “Always make new mistakes”.

Publications and business ventures

Currently, Dyson is a board member and active investor in a variety of start-ups, mostly in online services, health care, logistics, artificial intelligence, emerging markets, and space travel.

Previously, Dyson and her company EDventure Holdings specialized in analyzing the effect of emerging technologies and markets on economies and societies. She produced the following publications on technology:
 Release 1.0, her monthly technology-industry newsletter (started by Ben Rosen), published by EDventure Holdings. Until 2006, Dyson wrote most issues herself and edited the others. When she left CNET, the newsletter was picked up by O'Reilly Media, which appointed Jimmy Guterman to edit it and renamed the newsletter Release 2.0. 
 Rel-EAST, a sister newsletter focused on the technology industry in Eastern Europe.
 Release 2.0, her 1997 book on how the Internet affects individuals' lives. Its full title is Release 2.0: A design for living in the digital age. The revision Release 2.1 was published in 1998.

Philanthropy
Dyson is an active member of a number of non-profit and advisory organizations. From 1998 to 2000, she was the founding chairman of ICANN, the Internet Corporation for Assigned Names and Numbers. As of 2004, she sat on its "reform" committee (the At-Large Advisory Committee), dedicated to defining a role for individuals in ICANN's decision-making and governance structures. She opposed ICANN's 2012 expansion of generic top-level domains (gTLDs). She has followed closely the post-Soviet transition of Eastern Europe, from 2002 to 2012 was a member of the Bulgarian President's IT Advisory Council, along with Vint Cerf, George Sadowsky, and Veni Markovski, among others. She has served as a trustee of, and helped fund, emerging organizations such as Glasses for Humanity, Bridges.org, the National Endowment for Democracy, the Eurasia Foundation, StopBadware, and the Sunlight Foundation.

Currently, she is a trustee of Charity Navigator, ExpandED Schools (outside-of-class services for kids), the Long Now Foundation, Open Corporates, and The Commons Project, where she chairs the comp and culture committee.

Other pursuits
Dyson was  one of the first ten volunteers for George Church’s Personal Genome Project where you can find her complete genome. 

Dyson has served as a judge for Mayor Michael Bloomberg's NYC BigApps competition in New York.

See also
 Space Adventures clients who trained, but did not fly in space

References

External links

 EDventure.com official website
 Column archive at Project Syndicate
 
 
 
 
 
  by Allan Gregg for TVOntario (1997) (See also programme information)
 
 Esther Dyson profile at Space Angels Network
 

1951 births
Living people
American expatriates in Switzerland
American financial commentators
American investors
American people of English descent
American philanthropists
American reporters and correspondents
American technology chief executives
American technology journalists
American technology writers
American venture capitalists
American women chief executives
American women journalists
Freeman Dyson
Harvard Graduate School of Arts and Sciences alumni
Naturalized citizens of the United States
Writers from Zürich
Swiss emigrants to the United States
Wired (magazine) people
Women business and financial journalists
The Harvard Crimson people